Gellersen is a Samtgemeinde ("collective municipality") in the district of Lüneburg, in Lower Saxony, Germany. It is situated approximately 5 km west of Lüneburg. Its seat is in the village Reppenstedt.

The Samtgemeinde Gellersen consists of the following municipalities:

 Kirchgellersen 
 Reppenstedt
 Südergellersen 
 Westergellersen

Samtgemeinden in Lower Saxony